The Big Flower Fight is a British television competition program first broadcast on Netflix on 18 May 2020. It is a contest in the style of The Great British Bake Off and The Great British Sewing Bee but with the craft of floral design instead of baking or sewing.

The show is presented by Natasia Demetriou and Vic Reeves, with Kristen Griffith-VanderYacht serving as a mentor and main judge, as well as a different guest judge in each episode.

The first season was filmed in Maidstone, Kent.

At the beginning of April 2021, Netflix had yet to announce any plans for a potential second season.

Series 1 (2020)

Contestants

Results summary 

Colour key:

 The contestants won the challenge and were declared Best in Bloom
 The contestants were one of the best, but were not the winners of the challenge
 The contestants were neither in the top or in the bottom, thus advancing to the next round
 The contestants were in the bottom but were not eliminated
 The contestants were eliminated
 The contestants reached the finals, but did not win the series
 The contestants won the series

Episode themes

References

External links
 

2020s British reality television series
2020 British television series debuts
Television series by ITV Studios
English-language Netflix original programming
Reality competition television series